Sigourney is a city in Keokuk County, Iowa, United States. The population was 2,004 at the time of the 2020 census. It is the county seat of Keokuk County. Keokuk County Courthouse is located in the Public Square Historic District. Both are on the National Register of Historic Places.

History
Keokuk County was opened for Euro-American settlement in 1843, and the town got its start in 1844 when S.A. James built the first cabin there. Other families began to settle there as well, and in 1844, the town was named by county commissioner Dr. George H. Stone in honor of popular poet Lydia Sigourney. A large oil-painted portrait of Lydia still graces the foyer of the county courthouse.

Geography
Sigourney's longitude and latitude coordinatesin decimal form are 41.333244, -92.203220.

Demographics

2010 census
As of the census of 2010, there were 2,059 people, 878 households, and 537 families living in the city. The racial makeup of the city was 98.2% White, 0.7% African American, 0.2% Native American, 0.3% Asian, 0.1% from other races, and 0.4% from two or more races. Hispanic or Latino of any race were 0.4% of the population.

There were 878 households, of which 27.8% had children under the age of 18 living with them, 47.5% were married couples living together, 9.5% had a female householder with no husband present, 4.2% had a male householder with no wife present, and 38.8% were non-families. 34.3% of all households were made up of individuals, and 18.7% had someone living alone who was 65 years of age or older. The average household size was 2.23 and the average family size was 2.85.

The median age in the city was 45.1 years. 22.5% of residents were under the age of 18; 6.6% were between the ages of 18 and 24; 20.8% were from 25 to 44; 24.9% were from 45 to 64; and 25.2% were 65 years of age or older. The gender makeup of the city was 47.0% male and 53.0% female.

2000 census
As of the census of 2000, there were 2,209 people, 903 households, and 567 families living in the city. The racial makeup of the city was 99.09% White, 0.14% African American, 0.14% Native American, 0.45% Asian, 0.14% from other races, and 0.05% from two or more races. Hispanic or Latino of any race were 0.54% of the population.

There were 903 households, out of which 29.6% had children under the age of 18 living with them, 51.4% were married couples living together, 9.0% had a female householder with no husband present, and 37.1% were non-families. 33.6% of all households were made up of individuals, and 21.5% had someone living alone who was 65 years of age or older. The average household size was 2.29 and the average family size was 2.93.

Age spread: 23.9% under the age of 18, 7.9% from 18 to 24, 22.7% from 25 to 44, 18.8% from 45 to 64, and 26.7% who were 65 years of age or older. The median age was 42 years. For every 100 females, there were 79.7 males. For every 100 females age 18 and over, there were 75.8 males.

The median income for a household in the city was $29,803, and the median income for a family was $43,519. Males had a median income of $29,783 versus $21,078 for females. The per capita income for the city was $17,218. About 8.5% of families and 10.8% of the population were below the poverty line, including 14.0% of those under age 18 and 10.7% of those age 65 or over.

Government
Sigourney is represented by Rep. Mariannette Miller-Meeks in the United States House of Representatives.

Education
The Sigourney Community School District encompasses nearly a  radius, drawing students from smaller surrounding communities. Approximately 700 students are enrolled yearly, with an average of 350 attending elementary (K-6) and 350 students attending junior/senior high (7-12). The average graduating class is 50 students with 80% moving on to college. The school system's mascot is the Sigourney Savage.

Notable people 

William Lawrence Adrian (1883–1972), Roman Catholic bishop
Ambrose Burke, (1895–1998), Roman Catholic priest and educator
John Burke (1859–1938) tenth Governor of North Dakota, United States Treasurer, North Dakota Supreme Court justice
Katharine Goeldner, opera singer
S.J. Mathes (1849–1927), newspaperman
Ernest L. Parker (1864–1934), 13th Lieutenant Governor of Idaho
Dan Peiffer (born 1951) NFL football player
Ezekiel S. Sampson (1831–1896), district judge and U.S. Representative

References

External links

 
Sigourney-iowa.com official city website
Sigourney News-Review
City-Data Comprehensive Statistical Data and more about Sigourney

 
Cities in Keokuk County, Iowa
Cities in Iowa
County seats in Iowa
Populated places established in 1844
1844 establishments in Iowa Territory